Chitina Airport  is a public/civil-use airport located  north of Chitina, Alaska, United States.

Although most U.S. airports use the same three-letter location identifier for the FAA, ICAO and IATA, Chitina Airport is assigned CXC by the FAA and IATA but has no designation from the ICAO.

Facilities 
For the 12-month period ending December 31, 2019, the airport had 1,750 aircraft operations. At that time, there was one aircraft based at this airport, a single-engine.

Airlines and destinations

References

External links 

Airports in Copper River Census Area, Alaska
Airports established in 1962
1962 establishments in Alaska